The Cinema Museum is a museum in Kennington, London, and a charitable organisation. Its collection was founded in 1986 by Ronald Grant and Martin Humphries, from their own private collection of cinema history and memorabilia. Its current building was once a workhouse where Charlie Chaplin lived as a child.

History
First established in 1986 in Raleigh Hall in Brixton, the museum later moved to Kennington; since 1998, it has been based at 2 Dugard Way in the London Borough of Lambeth, the administration block of the former Lambeth Workhouse, in a building owned by the South London and Maudsley NHS Foundation Trust.  

The workhouse has a link to cinema history as Charlie Chaplin lived there as a child when his mother faced destitution. The museum runs a programme of talks and events and is currently open by appointment for tours.

Having survived a threat to its existence owing to the proposed sale of the building,  the museum was engaged in efforts to secure its future with public funding.  The museum has been the subject of a documentary by The Guardian, and a 2008 documentary by the Canadian film artist Mark Lewis.

Collection

The museum's collection includes items relating to film production, film exhibition and the experience of cinema-going from the earliest days  of cinema to the present. It holds examples of every gauge of film projector, professional and amateur, ever manufactured. 

The museum holds a collection of early films by Mitchell and Kenyon, the Blackburn film production company, dating from 1899 to 1906. These films were featured at the Pordenone Cinema Muto (silent film festival) in 1997.

According to Time Out, "The Cinema Museum in Lambeth boasts an idiosyncratic collection of film memorabilia, including posters, art deco cinema chairs, ushers' uniforms from the 1940s and '50s, tickets, ashtrays and popcorn cartons, as well as an archive boasting hundreds of books, an estimated one million plus photos and 17 million feet of film."  At its events volunteers regularly dress in original cinema attendants' costumes.

The museum seeks to celebrate all aspects of cinema and the moving image from silent films shown in exactly the correct gauge and at the right speed using specially adapted projectors, to screenings of modern television culture. It is developing a growing reputation  for its eclectic range of events.

The cinema bar was rated the eighth-best pub in Kennington by readers of Londonist in 2013.

It is located near Elephant and Castle and Kennington tube stations.

Sale of museum building
In 2017, it was announced that the South London and Maudsley NHS Foundation Trust which owns the building and leases it to the Museum, had decided to put the building up for sale on the open market. A campaign was launched with support from actors and filmmakers such as Ken Loach, and a petition to keep the Museum at the site has gained almost 52,000 signatures as of October 2020.

Items from the collection

References

External links

London's unusual museums in The Daily Telegraph
British Home Movie Day in The Guardian
10 Best Arts venues in South London in The Guardian
Behind the scenes at the Cinema Museum with Michele Hanson in The Guardian

1986 establishments in England
Brixton
Cinema museums in London
Kennington
Museums established in 1986
Museums in the London Borough of Lambeth
Workhouses in London